The 1998 NCAA Women's Division I Swimming and Diving Championships were contested at the 17th annual NCAA-sanctioned swim meet to determine the team and individual national champions of Division I women's collegiate swimming and diving in the United States. 

This year's events were hosted at the University Aquatic Center at the University of Minnesota in Minneapolis, Minnesota. 

Stanford topped the team standings, finishing 44 points ahead of Arizona. It was the Cardinal's record eighth national title and their sixth in seven seasons.

Team standings
Note: Top 10 only
(H) = Hosts
(DC) = Defending champions
Full results

See also
List of college swimming and diving teams

References

NCAA Division I Swimming And Diving Championships
NCAA Division I Swimming And Diving Championships
NCAA Division I Women's Swimming and Diving Championships